The 2019 World Indoor Lacrosse Championship (WILC) was the fifth international box lacrosse championship organized by World Lacrosse every four years. It was held 19-28 September 2019 at the Langley Events Centre in Langley, British Columbia, Canada.  The winner of the WILC wins the Cockerton Cup, named for All-American lacrosse player Stan Cockerton.

Venues
The competition was hosted in two venues in Langley, BC: Langley Events Centre and Aldergrove Credit Union Community Centre.

Teams
A record 20 countries competed in the 2019 World Indoor Lacrosse Championships. New entrants included Hong Kong, Costa Rica, Mexico and the Netherlands.

 
  Austria
  
  Costa Rica
  
  England
  Finland
  Germany
  Hong Kong
  Ireland
  
  Israel
  Mexico
  Netherlands
  Serbia
  
  Slovakia
  Sweden
  Switzerland
  

Source:

Pool play 
The teams were divided into four divisions, with the five highest-ranked teams placed in the Blue Division and the others being split into the Yellow, Green, and Orange Divisions. In the Blue Division, the top two teams advanced to the semifinals, the third and fourth teams entered the quarterfinals and the fifth team was placed in the first round of the championship bracket. The first place teams in the Yellow, Green, and Orange Divisions entered the championship bracket, while the other teams were placed in the placement bracket.

The Canadians won the event, with Iroquois, United States, and England placing second, third, and fourth, respectively.

Blue Division

Yellow Division

Green Division

Orange Division

Championship Round

1st-4th Placement
{{4RoundBracket-Byes
| RD1=Qualifier
| RD2=Quarter-finals
| RD3=Semifinals
| RD4=Final

| group1=
| group2=

| RD1-seed01=
| RD1-team01=
| RD1-score01=
| RD1-seed02=
| RD1-team02=
| RD1-score02=

| RD1-seed03=
| RD1-team03=
| RD1-score03=
| RD1-seed04=
| RD1-team04=
| RD1-score04=

| RD1-seed05=B5
| RD1-team05=
| RD1-score05=15
| RD1-seed06=O1
| RD1-team06=| RD1-score06=6

| RD1-seed07=
| RD1-team07=
| RD1-score07=
| RD1-seed08=
| RD1-team08=
| RD1-score08=

| RD1-seed09=
| RD1-team09=
| RD1-score09=
| RD1-seed10=
| RD1-team10=
| RD1-score10=

| RD1-seed11=
| RD1-team11=
| RD1-score11=
| RD1-seed12=
| RD1-team12=
| RD1-score12=

| RD1-seed13=Y1
| RD1-team13=
| RD1-score13=6
| RD1-seed14=G1
| RD1-team14=| RD1-score14=17| RD1-seed15=
| RD1-team15=
| RD1-score15=
| RD1-seed16=
| RD1-team16=
| RD1-score16=

| RD2-seed01=B1
| RD2-team01=| RD2-score01=
| RD2-seed02=
| RD2-team02=Bye| RD2-score02=

| RD2-seed03=B4
| RD2-team03=
| RD2-score03=7
| RD2-seed04=B5
| RD2-team04=| RD2-score04=9| RD2-seed05=B2
| RD2-team05=| RD2-score05=
| RD2-seed06=
| RD2-team06=Bye| RD2-score06=

| RD2-seed07=B3
| RD2-team07=| RD2-score07=17| RD2-seed08=G1
| RD2-team08=
| RD2-score08=3

| RD3-seed01=B1
| RD3-team01=| RD3-score01=21| RD3-seed02=B5
| RD3-team02=
| RD3-score02=4

| RD3-seed03=B2
| RD3-team03=| RD3-score03=9| RD3-seed04=B3
| RD3-team04=
| RD3-score04=7

| RD4-seed01=B1
| RD4-team01=| RD4-score01=19| RD4-seed02=B2
| RD4-team02=
| RD4-score02=12

| RD4-seed03=B5
| RD4-team03=
| RD4-score03=8
| RD4-seed04=B3
| RD4-team04=| RD4-score04=11}}

5th-8th Placement

9th-12th Placement

13th-16th Placement

17th-20th Placement

Ranking, leaders, and awards 
Final ranking

Scoring leaders

Goaltending leaders

 All World Team

Forwards

Mark Matthews, Canada

Randy Staats, Iroquois

Transition

Joel White, United States

Defense

Graeme Hossack, Canada

Kyle Rubisch, Canada

Goaltender

Mike Poulin, Canada

Most Valuable Player
Cody Jamieson, Forward, Iroquois

 President's Team ForwardsRobert Raittila, Finland

Matthew Taylor, AustraliaTransitionAdrian Balasch, AustriaDefenseDavid Beckmann, Germany

Markus Mattila, FinlandGoaltender'''

Craig Wende, Germany

References

External links
 2019 World Indoor Lacrosse Championships

World Indoor Lacrosse Championship
World Indoor Lacrosse Championship
World Indoor Lacrosse Championship